Ledex produces a line of motorized solenoids and electric switches used in a wide variety of industrial applications. The original product used a ratcheting system to provide one-way motion so that every activation advanced the switch one position. The company used the same concept to develop a number of similar products and later branched out to the wider industrial switching market. The company is currently owned by Johnson Electric in Hong Kong. Over time the term has become generic and can now refer to any similar motorized switch. Ledex was founded by G.H. Leland. Its predecessor was GH Leland Engineering in Dayton Ohio. Patents were filed on its behalf in 1950. Six of their Syncramental Servo-Step motors rode along on the Mercury capsule in the first manned spacecraft, Feb 20, 1962. Mariner IV used a Ledex rotary solenoid to actuate the onboard camera to take the first pictures of Mars from Martian orbit. Surveyor used Ledex stepping motors to orient the data antenna after landing on the moon. Apollo spacecraft used Ledex rotary solenoids to release the spring loaded latches located between the Command Module and the Lunar Landing Module to complete hard docking of the two modules.
Johnson Electric in North America is located north of Dayton Ohio.

References
 

Electronics companies of the United States